Neslihan is a Turkish feminine given name that means 'noble'. Notable people with the name include:

 Neslihan Atagül (born 1992), Turkish actress
 Neslihan Demir Darnel (born 1983), Turkish volleyball player
 Neslihan Kavas (born 1987), Turkish para table tennis player
 Neslihan Muratdağı (born 1988), Turkish FIFA listed football referee
 Neslihan Şenocak (born 1976), Turkish historian
 Neslihan Yakupoğlu (born 1990), Turkish handball player
 Neslihan Yiğit (born 1994), Turkish badminton player
 Neslihan (singer) (born 1983), Turkish singer

See also
 MV Yasa Neslihan, a 2008 hijacked bulk cargo vessel sailing under the flag of Marshall Islands

Turkish feminine given names

de:Neslihan